Syntozyga is a genus of moths belonging to the subfamily Olethreutinae of the family Tortricidae.

Species
Syntozyga anconia (Meyrick, 1911)
Syntozyga aspersana (Kuznetzov, 1988)
Syntozyga bicuspis Diakonoff, 1973
Syntozyga endaphana (Diakonoff, 1968)
Syntozyga ephippias (Meyrick, 1907)
Syntozyga episema (Diakonoff, 1973)
Syntozyga macrosperma Diakonoff, 1971
Syntozyga negligens (Diakonoff, 1973)
Syntozyga pedias (Meyrick, 1920)
Syntozyga psammetalla Lower, 1901
Syntozyga sedifera (Meyrick, 1911)
Syntozyga spirographa (Diakonoff, 1968)
Syntozyga stagonophora Diakonoff, 1973
Syntozyga transversa (Diakonoff, 1973)

See also
List of Tortricidae genera

References

External links
tortricidae.com

Bactrini
Tortricidae genera